Wayne Paul Maddison , is a professor and Canada Research Chair at the departments of zoology and botany at the University of British Columbia, and the Director of the Spencer Entomological Collection at the Beaty Biodiversity Museum.

His research concerns the phylogeny, biodiversity, and evolution of jumping spiders (Salticidae), of which he has discovered new species and genera.

He has also done research in phylogenetic theory, developing and perfecting various methods used in comparative biology, such as character state inference in internal nodes through maximum parsimony, squared-change parsimony, or character correlation through the concentrated changes test or pairwise comparisons. In collaboration with David R. Maddison, he worked on the Mesquite open-source phylogeny software, the MacClade program, and the Tree of Life Web Project.

His research has led him to discover new species of jumping spiders in Sarawak and Papua New Guinea.

Selected publications

References

External links

 Wayne Maddison Lab

Academic staff of the University of British Columbia
Canada Research Chairs
Arachnologists
Fellows of the Royal Society of Canada
Living people
Harvard University alumni
Canadian zoologists
University of Toronto alumni
Year of birth missing (living people)